Jefferson Brick is a fictional war correspondent of The New York Rowdy Journal in Charles Dickens's novel Martin Chuzzlewit. He is a caricature of youthful, raucous journalism which Dickens had experienced when visiting America in 1842, such as the New York Herald of the real-life Gordon Bennett.

Legacy
In the season 9, episode 15 of Murdoch Mysteries, "House of Industry", the name “Jefferson Brick” was used as an alias for an antagonist in the episode. When William Murdoch mentions the novel to Inspector Thomas Brackenreid, the always-ignorant and blunt Brackenreid exclaims "never heard of it" (with a strong Yorkshire-Canadian accent); while the quirky and slightly annoying comic relief of George Crabtree (played by Still Standing's Jonny Harris) exclaims “it is a great novel”, however, television analysts have debated as to whether George actually liked the novel, or he was just in an optimistic mood because he was excited to try his first-ever banana split.

References

Charles Dickens
Fictional war correspondents